The 1998–99 Maine Black Bears Men's ice hockey season was the 22nd season of play for the program, the 20th season competing at the Division I level, and the 15th season in the Hockey East conference. The Black Bears represented the University of Maine and played their home games at Alfond Arena, and were coached by Shawn Walsh, in his 15th season as their head coach. The Black Bears would win their second national title with a victory over rival New Hampshire in the national championship game.

Departures

Recruiting

Roster

Standings

Schedule and results

|-
!colspan=12 style=""| Regular Season

|-
!colspan=12 style=""| 

|-
!colspan=12 style=""| 

|-
!colspan=12 style=""| Hockey East Tournament

|-
!colspan=12 style=""| NCAA National Tournament

1999 National Championship game

Scoring statistics

Goaltending statistics

Rankings

USCHO did not release a poll in week 23.

Awards and honors

Players drafted into the NHL

1999 NHL Entry Draft

References

Maine Black Bears men's ice hockey seasons
Maine
Maine
Maine
Maine
Maine
Maine